The Herbettes Aqueduct is one of several aqueducts on the Canal du Midi. In Toulouse France, it carries the canal over a four-lane highway in a metal trough. The trough has been colorfully painted underneath.

See also
 Locks on the Canal du Midi

References

External links
 Photo

Aqueducts on Canal du Midi